Danger: Low Brow was a comedy show on Melbourne radio station 3RRR from 1985 to 1991, before moving to Triple M and then Fox FM.

Members and Where Are They Now
The original members of the show were:

Leaping Larry L Currently writing for The Age newspaper, co-host of All Over The Shop on 102.7 3RRR Thursdays at 2pm, writes on Leaping Larry L's crappy blog.
Dennis Twilight (aka Dennis Tomaras).
The Audio Assassin (aka David Armstrong) Currently reading the news on Melbourne radio's 3AW. 
Brett Duck (aka Brett McLeod) Currently reporting/reading the news on Melbourne television's Nine Network.

The Arriba! Sessions (Album)
This album featured sketches which originated on the show from 1985 to 1989, completely re-recorded and issued in 1989, on cassette only. It included a number of ad parodies, the mock Beatles historical documentary "Do-It-Yourself Beatles", the fabricated movie trailer "Kung Fu Rabbi", and a travesty on English soccer commentary entitled "Big Genital Soccer".

Appetite For Arriba! (Album)
An album of sketches originating on the show from 1988 to 1990, re-recorded and released in 1990, on vinyl LP and cassette.

References

Australian comedy radio programs